Norman Lawrence "Skip" Wymard (December 30, 1890 – June 23, 1970) was an American football player and coach.  He served as the head football at Fordham University for one season, in 1914, compiling a record of 6–3–1. Wymard played tackle at Georgetown University.

Wymard was later an attorney based in Pittsburgh, Pennsylvania. In 1949, he was appointed as the secretary to Pennsylvania Governor James H. Duff.

Head coaching record

References

1890 births
1970 deaths
20th-century American lawyers
American football tackles
Fordham Rams football coaches
Georgetown Hoyas football players
Pennsylvania lawyers
Coaches of American football from Pennsylvania
Players of American football from Pittsburgh